Călărași is a commune in Cluj County, Transylvania, Romania. It is composed of three villages: Bogata (Bogátpuszta), Călărași and Călărași Gară (Harasztosi vasútitelep).

Demographics

According to the 2011 census, Romanians made up 64.4% of the population, Hungarians made up 32.6% and Roma made up 0.4%.

References

Communes in Cluj County
Localities in Transylvania